Petra Marie Sofie Bernhoft (July 21, 1870 – February 17, 1966) was a Norwegian actress.

Sofie Bernhoft was the daughter of the prison priest and catechist Theodor Kristian Bernhoft (1833–1885) and Petra Martine Augusta Bernhoft (1841–?). She was the sister of the writer Hermine Bernhoft-Osa. She was married to the violinist and composer Halfdan Jebe (1868–1937).

Bernhoft started performing at the Central Theater in 1897, initially under Johan Fahlstrøm and later under the leadership of Rudolf Rasmussen. During the 1900–1901 season she was engaged with the Second Theater, and then in 1903 she started performing at the Fahlstrøm Theater. She also appeared in performances at the Mayol Theater, the Norwegian Theater, and the Carl Johan Theater.

She was with the Stavanger Permanent Theater from 1918 to 1919 and later with NRK's Radio Theater. Bernhoft appeared in five films between 1933 and 1947, debuting in Gustaf Molander's En stille flirt.

She ran her own theater school in Oslo, where Guri Stormoen was among her students.

Filmography
 1933: En stille flirt as Amalia
 1938: Bør Børson Jr. as the priest's wife
 1942: Trysil-Knut as Olga Liplassen
 1943: Den nye lægen as Madam Anders
 1947: Sankt Hans fest as Mrs. Kruse

References

External links
 
 Sofie Bernhoft at the Swedish Film Database
 Sofie Bernhoft at Filmfront

1870 births
1966 deaths
Norwegian stage actresses
Norwegian film actresses
20th-century Norwegian actresses
Actresses from Oslo